First Album is the debut album by Nottingham-based project Twelve, released on CD. Twelve is the side project of Six By Seven member Chris Olley.

Track listing

 "Intro"
 "Talkin' About"
 "Travellin' Light"
 "Never Let You go"
 "One Seventeen"
 "Police Cars"
 "Part II"
 "Now"

External links
Review of Twelve's First Album

Chris Olley albums
2003 debut albums